Charles Biderman (born October 24, 1946) is an American businessman and investor. He is the founder of TrimTabs Asset Management, TrimTabs Investment Research, Inc., a publisher of detailed daily coverage of stock market liquidity. He is interviewed regularly on CNBC and Bloomberg TV and is quoted frequently in the financial media, including Barron's Magazine, The Wall Street Journal, Forbes, and Investor's Business Daily.

Previously Biderman was general partner of limited partnerships that starting in 1975 controlled 1,000 Nashville, Tennessee apartments, office buildings in Dallas, Texas and Memphis, Tennessee and six strip shopping centers in Mississippi, Arkansas, Kentucky and Tennessee.

He is the author of TrimTabs Investing: Using Liquidity Theory to Beat the Stock Market (John Wiley & Sons, 2005). Biderman holds a B.A. from Brooklyn College and an M.B.A. from Harvard Business School.

The TrimTabs Float Shrink ETF (NYSE symbol: TTFS)

TrimTabs Asset Management partnered with AdvisorShares to launch the AdvisorShares TrimTabs Float Shrink ETF  on October 4, 2011.  "TTFS is sub-advised by TrimTabs Asset Management ("Portfolio Manager"), a subsidiary of TrimTabs Investment Research (TrimTabs). The Fund seeks to achieve this objective by investing in stocks with liquidity and fundamental characteristics that are historically associated with superior long-term performance. Charles Biderman was a Portfolio Manager for the ETF along with Minyi Chen. Subsequently, TrimTabs has filed with the SEC to launch their own self-indexed ETFs without the aid of AdvisorShares.  On May 26, 2016, AdvisorShares announced that it had removed TrimTabs Asset Management as manager of its TrimTabs Float Shrink ETF, which had about $178 million in assets at the time. AdvisorShares replaced TrimTabs with Wilshire Associates, of Santa Monica, California, but offered no explanation for the change. The name of the fund was changed to the Wilshire Buyback ETF but despite the name change AdvisorShares got to keep the TTFS stock ticker. The TTFS ETF had earned a coveted five-star Morningstar rating by delivering annualized returns of 19.22% as of March 31, 2016. TTFS had also outperformed both the NASDAQ Buyback Achievers Index by 2.2% annually and the Russell 3000 Index by 2.49% annually. "This is insane", TrimTabs CEO Charles Biderman said of the firing, "They came up with no reason, no nothing.” Charles Biderman claimed that it was nearly impossible for Wilshire to replicate TrimTabs stock selection methodology and his first move after the firing was to open a separately managed account with a lower minimum investment and lower fees than TTFS. 

On September 28, 2016 TrimTabs launched the TrimTabs U.S. Free Cash Flow Quality ETF under the ticker (BATS: TTAC) which used the same strategy as the TTFS ETF that they managed under AdvisorShares.  The Fund's expense ratio is be 0.59%. This was a reduction from the 0.99% fee that TrimTabs was required to charge under AdvisorShares.  A year after launching TTAC produced more positive alpha than TTFS, while being more closely correlated to the Vanguard Russell 3000 ETF (Nasdaq: VTHR) benchmark.  TTAC returned 27.08% in the November 2016 to December 2017 period, while TTFS only returned 19.4%.  On November 29, 2021 the TrimTabs U.S. Free Cash Flow Quality ETF changed its name to the FCF US Quality ETF.

TrimTabs International Free Cash Flow ETF (BATS symbol: TTAI)
TrimTabs Asset Management launched TrimTabs Intl Free Cash Flow (TTAI) in June 2017. TTAI invests in approximately 85 non-US companies that are growing Free Cash Flow, using a portion to reduce the overall share count and not increasing the debt to asset ratio.  On November 29, 2021 TrimTabs International Free Cash Flow Quality ETF (TTAI) changed its name to the FCF International Quality ETF.

References

External links
TrimTabs US Free Cash Flow Quality ETF
TrimTabs International Free Cash Flow Quality ETF

1946 births
Harvard Business School alumni
American chief executives of financial services companies
Living people
Businesspeople from California
American financial analysts
American stock traders
Stock and commodity market managers
American economics writers
American male non-fiction writers
American finance and investment writers
American investors
American money managers
Jewish American writers
Brooklyn College alumni
21st-century American Jews